Darnell C. Lindsay (August 6, 1987 – January 4, 2012) was an American professional basketball player. He played college basketball for the Lincoln Lynx and Tennessee Tech Golden Eagles. He was an early entrant in the 2009 NBA draft but was not selected.

Lindsay died on January 4, 2012.

References

External links

1987 births
2012 deaths
American expatriate basketball people in North Macedonia
American men's basketball players
Guards (basketball)
KK MZT Skopje players
Lincoln Lynx basketball players
People from Lincoln, Illinois